William McMinn (1844–14 February 1884) was an Irish-born Australian surveyor and architect, based in Adelaide.

Early life
McMinn was born in Newry, County Down, Ireland, a son of Joseph McMinn (c. 1794 – 6 April 1874) and his wife Martha McMinn, née Hamill (c. 1805 – 13 December 1861), who with their large family emigrated to Adelaide on the Albatross, arriving in September 1850. Newspaper reports only mention Mrs McMinn and 8 children aboard Albatross.

No details of his (or his brothers') schooling are known, though it has been asserted that he was taught by one Mr McGeorge of Adelaide, however no teacher of that or similar name has yet come to light.
It is likely the youngest children were home-educated, with the boys receiving tuition in drafting and surveying from a tutor.

Career
After completing school, he was articled to the architect James Macgeorge, and was appointed to the Architect-in-Chief's office, but in April 1864 left for employment as a chainman in Boyle Travers Finniss's 1864–65 expedition to Northern Australia surveying the area around Escape Cliffs and the Adelaide River. Following a breakdown of morale in the settlement, McMinn and six others (Stow, Hamilton, Hake, Edwards, White, and Davis, the last two being boatmen) purchased a 23-foot open boat which they dubbed the Forlorn Hope and sailed it  to Champion Bay, near Geraldton, Western Australia.

In late 1870 or early 1871 he was appointed as overseer of construction of the Overland Telegraph section from Port Augusta to Darwin, and on 3 May 1871 cancelled the contract tendered by Darwent & Dalwood, they having fallen behind schedule due to heavy rain. Critics of his action pointed out that with the onset of the dry season and better logistics this loss could easily have been made up. The work was put in the hands of engineer R. V. Patterson with instructions to finish the line by early 1872 no matter what the cost. McMinn was dismissed shortly after his return to Adelaide in July 1871, and William T. Dalwood was later awarded compensation of £11,000.

McMinn began practising as an architect in 1867, briefly in partnership with Daniel Garlick, and later with some others, but usually independently. He designed many grand private residences, but also designed or assisted in the design of many of Adelaide's grand public buildings. Whilst in partnership with Edward John Woods, he designed the original Venetian Gothic building (later designated the Mitchell Building) of the University of Adelaide, considered his greatest work.

Family
William McMinn (1844–1884) married Mary Frances Muirhead (1853–1929) at Glenelg on 14 March 1877; their family included:
Mary Muirhead McMinn (27 January 1878 – 1957) married Charles Arthur Johns (1871–1956) in 1913
Eileen Gordon McMinn (1879– ) married Rev. Harvey Langford Ebbs (1914–1987) on 31 August 1904

They had a home "Rutherdale" in Lower Mitcham.

McMinn had five sisters and two brothers in South Australia
Susanna Draper McMinn (c. 1829 – 2 February 1872) married Luke Michael Cullen ( – c. 25 November 1880), solicitor of Cullen & Wigmore in 1851. He was noted for shady and corrupt practices.
Mary McMinn (c. 1830 – 6 October 1918) arrived separately in July 1850 aboard Sultana, married William Brewer (c. 1812 – 30 December 1877) in 1857, lived in Kapunda
Eliza Anna Brewer (died 1918?) married John Rudall (died 1897) in 1864; married James Bray in 1899
Annie Josephine Brewer (born 1864) married David McIntosh Cameron in 1885
Mary Hamill Brewer (born 1866) married Mayoh Miller in 1886, lived Avoca Station, New South Wales
Frank Ernest Brewer (Born 21 Feb 1859) Married (6 June 1882) Rose Jane Hammond (b 26 July 1861), Lived in Adelaide and Fremantle WA
Jane McMinn (30 September 1831 – c. June 1914) married F. S. (Frederick Simeon) Carus Driffield (c. 1828 – 18 June 1889) on 22 January 1856
Three unmarried sisters: Sally or Sallie, Martha, and Elizabeth R. "Lizzie" McMinn (c. 1840 – 26 December 1937) ran a small school for girls from the family home, then in February 1884 founded Tormore House School, North Adelaide, which they ran for 13 years. They left for England on 15 December 1897, retiring to "Wolverton Gardens" in Ealing.
Gilbert Rotherdale McMinn (1841–1924), worked as a surveyor on the Overland Telegraph Line, in February 1871 discovering Simpsons Gap, which proved a better route for the line. He served in various senior public service positions in the Northern Territory. McMinn Street, Darwin is named for him.
Joseph McMinn (c. 1846 – 9 February 1888) married Charlotte Isabella "Chatty" Wells (1856– ) of Penola, was also a surveyor on the Overland Telegraph, later in charge of Willowie State forest, Wilmington, South Australia, where he died.
William D'Urney McMinn (1884– ) married Clarice Duck (died 6 May 1938) at Rosedale, Victoria on 15 March 1917 and had a large family

Major works

Architect

 The Austral Hotel in Rundle Street
 Torrens Park (now Scotch College, Adelaide)

Assistant

References

Further reading

Australian surveyors
1844 births
1884 deaths
Architects from Adelaide
19th-century Australian architects
Irish emigrants to colonial Australia